Matthew Norris (born 18 December 1992) is a South African cricketer. He is a left-handed batsman and a left-arm orthodox bowler. He made his first class debut for Cardiff MCCU against Glamorgan  on 2 April 2014.

References

External links

1992 births
Living people
South African cricketers
Cardiff MCCU cricketers